Irland-Redaktion was a pro-German propaganda radio station that broadcast from Germany during the Second World War. It was founded by Ludwig Mühlhausen in December 1939. He left it after two years to work with the S.S. in France.

References

External links 
https://www.youtube.com/watch?v=m6-w5oI4318

Defunct radio stations in Germany
Radio in Nazi Germany